The sartorius muscle is the longest muscle in the human body. It is a long, thin, superficial muscle that runs down the length of the thigh in the anterior compartment.

Structure
The sartorius muscle originates from the anterior superior iliac spine, and part of the notch between the anterior superior iliac spine and anterior inferior iliac spine. It runs obliquely across the upper and anterior part of the thigh in an inferomedial direction.
It passes behind the medial condyle of the femur to end in a tendon. This tendon curves anteriorly to join the tendons of the gracilis and semitendinosus muscles in the pes anserinus, where it inserts into the superomedial surface of the tibia.

Its upper portion forms the lateral border of the femoral triangle, and the point where it crosses adductor longus marks the apex of the triangle. Deep to sartorius and its fascia is the adductor canal, through which the saphenous nerve, femoral artery and vein, and nerve to vastus medialis pass.

Innervation
Like the other muscles in the anterior compartment of the thigh, the sartorius is innervated by the femoral nerve.

Variation
It may originate from the outer end of the inguinal ligament, the notch of the ilium, the ilio-pectineal line or the pubis.

The muscle may be split into two parts, and one part may be inserted into the fascia lata, the femur, the ligament of the patella or the tendon of the semitendinosus.

The tendon of insertion may end in the fascia lata, the capsule of the knee-joint, or the fascia of the leg.

The muscle may be absent in some people.

Function
The sartorius muscle can move the hip joint and the knee joint, but all of its actions are weak, making it a synergist muscle. At the hip, it can flex, weakly abduct, and laterally rotate the femur. At the knee, it can flex the leg; when the knee is flexed, sartorius medially rotates the leg. Sitting cross-legged demonstrates all four actions of the sartorius.

Clinical significance
One of the many conditions that can disrupt the use of the sartorius is pes anserine bursitis, an inflammatory condition of the medial portion of the knee. This condition usually occurs in athletes from overuse and is characterized by pain, swelling and tenderness. The pes anserinus involves the tendons of the gracilis, semitendinosus, and sartorius muscles; these tendons attach onto the anteromedial proximal tibia. When inflammation of the bursae underlying the tendons occurs, they separate from the head of the tibia.

History 
The name sartorius comes from the Latin word sartor, meaning tailor, and it is sometimes called the tailor's muscle. This name was chosen in reference to the cross-legged position in which tailors once sat. In French, a muscle name itself "couturier" comes from this specific position which is referred to as "sitting as a tailor" (in French: "s'asseoir en tailleur"). There are other hypotheses as to the origin of the name. One is that it refers to the location of the inferior portion of the muscle being the "inseam" or area of the inner thigh that tailors commonly measure when fitting trousers. Another is that the muscle closely resembles a tailor's ribbon. Additionally, antique sewing machines required continuous crossbody pedaling. This combination of lateral rotation and flexion of the hip and flexion of the knee gave tailors particularly developed sartorius muscles.

Additional images

References

External links
 
 
 

Hip abductors
Hip flexors
Hip lateral rotators
Knee flexors
Thigh muscles
Anterior compartment of thigh
Muscles of the lower limb